The Harry Keith Barn near Penokee, Kansas was built in 1940.  It was listed on the National Register of Historic Places in 2013.

It was built in October 1940 by Harry Keith (1893-1961), with his brothers and neighbors.

It is built into a hillside with entrances on two  levels, thus is a bank barn. It has a gambrel roof with a hay hood at each end.

This was probably the Aermotor 702 model which was available from 1933 on, is a contributing structure in the listing. This fills a  water tank.

Today, the Kansas Barn Alliance offers tours of the barn during their annual BarnFest celebration.

References

External links

Barns on the National Register of Historic Places in Kansas
National Register of Historic Places in Graham County, Kansas
Buildings and structures completed in 1940
Bank barns
Barns with hay hoods